Citi Centre may refer to:

 Chennai Citi Centre, Mylapore, Chennai, India; a shopping centre
 Pompano Citi Centre, Pompano Beach, Florida, USA; a shopping center
 CitiGroup Center, NYC, NYS, USA; the iconic skyscraper headquarters of CitiCorp; aka Citi Center
 Citigroup Centre (disambiguation), aka Citi Centre
 Citicorp Center (disambiguation), aka Citi Center

See also

 city centre aka city center
 Citi (disambiguation)
 City (disambiguation)
 Center (disambiguation), including centre
 City Center (disambiguation)